Louis Fox (died  December 4, 1866) was an American professional billiards player in the mid-19th century who was briefly the U.S. champion. He is well known for an incident which may or may not have actually happened: He is alleged to have committed suicide as the result of losing a match after a fly interfered with play. The story has become a legend that is often reported as fact.

The confirmed facts are that Fox, who was defending his title as American champion, was defeated in a match by John Deery on September 7, 1865, at Washington Hall in Fox's home town, Rochester, New York; Fox went missing in Rochester on or about December 4, 1866; and his body was found in the Genesee River near the Rochester neighborhood of Charlotte on May 10, 1867. Washington Hall, since demolished, stood at the northeast corner of Main and Clinton, about three blocks east of the Genesee.

The classic version of the story is that Fox was on his way to victory when a fly settled on the cue ball. Fox repeatedly waved his cue stick over the ball to try to brush the fly away. On the third attempt, Fox touched the ball, technically a miscue, forfeiting his shot. His opponent Deery rallied to win the match. The stunned Fox left the billiard hall and committed suicide by diving into the Genesee River. Variations of the story's ending have him drowning himself immediately after the match; the next day; or some time later.

Contemporary sources reported Deery's victory, but apparently nothing about the fly. Reports of Fox's death disagreed on whether his death was thought to be by accident or suicide. Another element appearing in later versions of the story is an alleged $40,000 prize. The prize was actually $1,000.

References

External links
 New York Times May 11, 1867, report of Fox's death
 1870 book with scores and prize
 Semi-centennial History of the City of Rochester, 1884 report
 Google Books reference from New York Clipper Annual, 1892
 Championship Billiards, Old and New, 1898 (p.103) an early version
 Spink Sports Stories, 1921, source of the photo used here 
 Life magazine October 8, 1951, version of the story
 Sports Illustrated April 4, 1955 version
 A 2007 retelling
 Writeup about Washington Hall, later called Empire Theatre
 New York Public Library photos of Derry, Fox and other contemporary billiard players

1866 deaths
Year of birth missing
American carom billiards players
Sportspeople from Rochester, New York
Deaths by drowning in the United States